Anurager Chhowa is an Indian Bengali language drama television series which premiered on 7 February 2022 on Bengali entertainment channel Star Jalsha. This show is produced under the banner of Shree Venkatesh Films starring Dibyojyoti Dutta and Swastika Ghosh in the lead roles. It is an official remake of the Malayalam show Karuthamuthu.

Premise 
The show highlights the importance of good characteristics in life over external beauty.

Cast

Main 
 Dibyojyoti Dutta as Dr. Surjyo Sengupta – A Cardiologist; Prabir and Labanya's secondborn; Palak and Joy's brother; Tista's cousin; Deepa's husband; Urmi's ex-love interest turned brother in law; Mishka's love interest and ex-fiance., Shona and Rupa's Father.
 Swastika Ghosh as Deepanwita "Deepa" Majumdar Sengupta – Ajay's daughter; Ratna's step-daughter; Urmi's half-sister turned sister in law; Surjyo's wife., Shona and Rupa's Mother
 Ahona Dutta as Dr. Mishka Sen – A Surgeon; Papai's adoptive daughter; Surjyo's friend turned obsessive lover; Surjo's ex-fiance; Hiya's best friend turned murderer; Deepa's arch rival.

Recurring 
 Prarabdhi Singha as Joy Sengupta – Prabir and Labanya's lastborn; Palak's brother; Surjyo's brother turned step brother in law; Tista's cousin; Urmi's husband.
 Soumili Chakraborty as Urmi Majumdar Sengupta – Ajay and Ratna's daughter; Deepa's half-sister turned sister in law; Surjyo's ex-love interest; Joy's wife.
 Rupanjana Mitra as Labanya Sengupta – A businesswoman; Prabir's wife; Palak, Surjyo and Joy's mother; Megha,Sona and Rupa's grandmother.
 Debdut Ghosh as Prabir Sengupta – Labanya's husband; Palak, Surjyo and Joy's father; Megha,Sona and Rupa's grandfather.
 Prapti Chatterjee as Palak Sengupta – Prabir and Labanya's firstborn; Surjyo and Joy's sister; Tista's cousin; Megha's mother; Sona and Rupa's paternal aunt.
 Sheersha Banerjee / Sneha Deb as Tista Sengupta – Pratik and Anuja's daughter; Palak, Surjyo and Joy's cousin.
 Sayantani Sengupta Mullick as Anuja Sengupta – Pratik's wife; Tista's mother.
 Avrajit Chakraborty as Pratik Sengupta – Anuja's husband; Tista's father.
 Mallika Majumdar as Ratna Majumdar – Ajay's wife; Urmi's mother; Deepa's step-mother. 
 Bimal Chakroborty as Ajay Majumdar – Ratna's husband; Deepa and Urmi's father.
 Tanima Sen as Nistarini Devi – Ratna's mother; Urmi's grandmother. 
 Suman Banerjee as Papai – Mishka's adoptive father.
 Madhupriya Chowdhury as Hiya – Surjyo's ex-girlfriend (deceased).
 Shoumo Banerjee as Kabir Rizvi – A writer; Deepa's namesake brother.
 Anindya Banerjee as Tabla – A contract killer who was hired by Mishka to kill Deepa turned Deepa's namesake brother after seeing her innocence.
 Shaktipada Dey as Kumar – Deepa and Labanya's rival.

Reception

TRP Ratings

Adaptations

References

External links 
Anurager Chhowa at Disney+ Hotstar

Bengali-language television programming in India
Star Jalsha original programming
2022 Indian television series debuts